Mohamed Redouane Guemri (born 30 November 1956 in Oran) is an Algerian football forward who played for Algeria. He participated in the 1980 African Cup of Nations.

Redouane Guemri was born in Oran.

Career statistics

International goals

Honours

Personal
Best goalscorer in 1979 Ligue 1 with 11 goals

Club
Runner-up of the Algerian Cup in 1981, 1983

National team
Gold medal in the 1978 All-Africa Games in Algiers
Runner-up in the 1980 African Cup of Nations in Nigeria

References

External links
Player profile on DZFootball

1956 births
Living people
Footballers from Oran
Algerian footballers
Association football forwards
ASM Oran players
Algeria international footballers
1980 African Cup of Nations players
African Games gold medalists for Algeria
African Games medalists in football
Competitors at the 1978 All-Africa Games
21st-century Algerian people